Gold in the Hand (Spanish:Oro en la mano) is a 1943 Argentine drama film directed by Adelqui Migliar and starring Sebastián Chiola, José Olarra and Pepita Serrador.

Cast
 Sebastián Chiola 
 José Olarra 
 José Ruzzo 
 Domingo Sapelli 
 Pepita Serrador
 Froilán Varela

References

Bibliography 
 Alfred Charles Richard. Censorship and Hollywood's Hispanic image: an interpretive filmography, 1936-1955. Greenwood Press, 1993.

External links 

1943 films
Argentine drama films
1943 drama films
1940s Spanish-language films
Films directed by Adelqui Migliar
Argentine black-and-white films
1940s Argentine films